State Highway 289, known for most of its length as Preston Road, is a north–south Texas state highway.  It begins at the intersection of Preston Road and Loop 12/Northwest Highway in Dallas. The Preston Road designation comes from the fact that the highway generally follows the course of an older road known as the Preston Trail, which ran to the town of Preston [Bend] . Preston is now submerged by Lake Texoma. The road is known as Preston all the way north through the remainder of the Dallas-Fort Worth Metroplex to a junction with State Highway 56 west of Sherman,  near the Oklahoma border (except for the portion through Gunter, which is designated as 8th Street). Preston Road passes through many of the fast-growing northern Dallas suburbs, including Frisco and Plano, as well as Prosper and Celina, with many new housing developments being built along Preston.

History
On September 26, 1939, this route was renumbered from part of SH 14. Prior to June 28, 1989, SH 289 began north of downtown Dallas in the Oak Lawn neighborhood at its intersection with Pearl Street.  From there, the highway designation followed Cedar Springs Road northeast for less than a block, and upon an intersection with Maple Avenue, ran northwest up that street.  Less than a mile later at an intersection with Oak Lawn Avenue, the highway designation turned northeast up Oak Lawn, which it followed into Highland Park. There, it was known as Oak Lawn Avenue until an intersection with Armstrong Parkway, where it became Preston Road. On October 30, 1958, SH 289 was extended northward 3.6 miles.

Preston Road is one of the most congested highways in the Dallas/Fort Worth Metroplex, but due to urban growth along the highway,  room to add additional lanes is minimal, and no means exist to upgrade the road to freeway status without incurring significant cost to demolish businesses along the path. Instead, the nearby Dallas North Tollway generally parallels Preston Road. On June 28, 1989, the section of SH 289 from Loop 12 to a deleted section of Loop 354 was cancelled.

On November 19, 2009, an extension of SH 289 was completed from its previous terminus at SH 56 northward to a new connection with Farm to Market Road 120 near Pottsboro, Texas, another segment of the old Preston Trail, which ends on the south shore of Lake Texoma.  (FM 120 north of the connection has been renamed as State Highway 289, except for a very small segment northeast of the intersection, which was renamed as Spur 316.)  SH 289 officially ends at Elks Boulevard; the actual road continues for another 3–4 miles before ending at a local street in the Preston Bend community.

This provides another access route to North Texas Regional Airport, which has been proposed as a third airport for the DFW area. About US$63 million in bonds were sold by Grayson County. The Texas Department of Transportation has promised US$85 million in reimbursements for the bonds sold by the county.

Business routes
SH 289 has one current and one former business routes.

Celina bypass

Business State Highway 289-C (Bus. SH 289-C), formerly Loop 483, is a business loop that runs on the former routing of SH 289 through Celina. The route was bypassed in 1969 by SH 289 and redesignated Loop 483. Loop 483 was redesignated as Business SH 289-C on June 21, 1990.

Prosper bypass

Business State Highway 289-D (Bus. SH 289-D), formerly Loop 439, was a business loop that runs on the former routing of SH 289 through Prosper. The route was bypassed in 1966 by SH 289 and redesignated Loop 439. Loop 439 was redesignated as Business SH 289-D on June 21, 1990. On May 28, 2009 the section from FM 1193 north to FM 1461 was returned to Prosper and Celina.

Junction list

Gallery

See also
Preston Trail

References

External links
 
 "Bonds sold for new SH 289 project", The Herald Democrat, January 21, 2007

289
Transportation in Dallas County, Texas
Transportation in Collin County, Texas
Transportation in Grayson County, Texas